Mień  is a village in the administrative district of Gmina Brańsk, within Bielsk County, Podlaskie Voivodeship, in north-eastern Poland.

According to the 1921 census, the village was inhabited by 503 people, among whom 495 were Roman Catholic and 8 were Mosaic. At the same time, 495 inhabitants declared Polish nationality and 8 Jewish. There were 73 residential buildings in the village.

The village has a population of 610.

References

Villages in Bielsk County